Bridgewater Associates is an American investment management firm founded by Ray Dalio in 1975. The firm serves institutional clients including pension funds, endowments, foundations, foreign governments, and central banks.

It utilizes a global macro investing style based on economic trends such as inflation, currency exchange rates, and U.S. gross domestic product. Bridgewater Associates began as an institutional investment advisory service, graduated to institutional investing, and pioneered the risk parity investment approach in 1996.

In 1981, the company moved its headquarters from New York City to Westport, Connecticut, and currently employs 1,500 employees.

History
The firm's history includes the pioneering of industry strategies such as: currency overlay, the separation of alpha and beta strategies, the creation of absolute return products, and risk parity.  According to Financial News, the company was the fastest growing asset manager from 2000 until 2005 when it stopped accepting new accounts. Its assets under management have increased by 25% each year during the 2001-2010 decade with employees at eleven times their year 2000 levels. The company's Daily Observations research is reportedly read by leaders of central banks and managers of pension funds around the world.

1975-1990: Consulting, research, money management
Bridgewater Associates was founded by Ray Dalio in 1975 from an office in his Manhattan apartment. At that time, the business consisted exclusively of advising corporate clients and the management of domestic and international currency and interest rate risks. The firm later changed its emphasis and began selling economic advice to governments and corporations such as Nabisco and McDonald's.

The company began publishing a paid subscription research report called the Daily Observations which inspired McDonald's Corp. and its main supplier to  become clients in the early 1980s. Another client was Banks of Mid-America and its treasury department director, Bob Prince, later joined Bridgewater Associates as co-CIO. In 1981, the company moved its offices from New York City to Connecticut.

The company's first account was funded by a US$5 million fixed-income investment through Hilda Ochoa-Brillembourg of World Bank in 1987. In the mid-1980s, the firm changed its business focus from currency and interest rate management to global bonds and currencies for institutional investors. As a fixed income and currency adviser to institutional clients, the company gained a reputation as a currency trader and a developer of techniques for overlaying currencies. In 1990, it launched a hedge fund portfolio using monies from Kodak and Loews Corporation and began formally offering its currency overlay products to its clients.

1991-present: Pure Alpha, All Weather, Pure Alpha Major Markets
Bridgewater Associates developed several "innovative investment strategies" during the 1990s such as inflation-indexed bonds, currency overlay, emerging market debt, global bonds and "super-long duration bonds".  The firm also "pioneered the separation of alpha and beta" investments and developed a strategy called "alpha overlay" which involved a portfolio of "20 uncorrelated" investments, leveraged for risk or return and combined with cash or an investment market benchmark.

The firm launched its Pure Alpha fund and began to market portable alpha investment strategies in 1991. The Pure Alpha fund did well during the market's downturn of 2000 to 2003 and, as hedge funds became more popular, the company expanded its assets through its connections with various underfunded pension funds, some of which were already clients.  In 1992 the firm introduced its global bond overlay program. In 1995, company executives participated in the discussions at the U.S. Treasury  and advised federal government on the development of inflation-indexed bonds.

Bridgewater launched its All Weather hedge fund and pioneered the risk parity approach to portfolio management in 1996. The firm's assets under management grew from US$5 billion in the mid-1990s to US$38 billion by the year 2003. In June 2000, the firm was ranked as the best performing global bond manager for that year and the prior five years by Pensions & Investments magazine. In 2002, the company was ranked by Nelson Information as the World's Best Money Manager in recognition of the 16.3% return on its International Fixed Income program. The firm received the Global Investor Awards for Excellence-Global Bonds award in 2003. The following year the company received the Global Pensions (magazine) Currency Overlay Manager of the Year award, and 2 "best in class" awards from the PlanSponsor Operations Survey.

In 2006, the company's flagship Pure Alpha fund began "returning money" to its clients in order to maintain its investment strategy and enforce its "capacity limit." The firm began moving all of its clients into alternative strategies (either its All Weather or Pure Alpha Major Markets funds), thereby eliminating the traditional investment approach from its portfolios.  That year it was honored by PlanSponsor Magazine with the Lifetime Achievement Award and the Global Pensions magazine Currency Manager of the Year award and the Money Management Letters, Public Pension Fund Award for Excellence and the Alternatives Manager of the Year award.

By 2007, the firm's total assets under management grew to US$50 billion (from US$33 billion in the year 2000). According to a 2007 article in Barron's magazine, "nobody was better prepared for the global market crash" than its clients and subscribers to its Daily Observations. The company "began sounding alarms..in the spring of 2007 about the dangers of excessive financial leverage."  The company's researchers reviewed the public accounts of most of the major financial institutions around the globe and found that estimated future losses due to bad debts totaled US$839 billion. In December, these conclusions were reported to the U.S. Treasury Department when company founder Ray Dalio met with U.S. Treasury Secretary staff and other White House economic advisers. Bridgewater's Pure Alpha fund "spared its investors" from most of the stock market's "meltdown" in 2008. However, this strategy was not successful in 2009 when economic growth responded faster than anticipated and the Dow Jones Industrial Average increased by 19%  while the company's Pure Alpha fund reportedly gained a mere 2% to 4%. Bridgewater's Pure Alpha II has posted a historic average return of 10.4 percent with only 3 losing years. Senator John McCain visited the firm and addressed company employees during his 2008 presidential campaign.  The Teacher Retirement System of Texas (TRS) invested in $250 million in a stake in Bridgewater Associates Intermediate Holdings, LP.

Ray Dalio, the company's founder, began using the term "d-process" in February 2009 to describe the deleveraging and deflationary process of the subprime mortgage industry as distinct from a recession. That year, the company was termed the largest hedge fund in the U.S. and it received the Alternative Investment News 7th Annual Hedge Fund Industry's Lifetime Achievement award and PlanSponsor's Hedge Fund Manager of the year award.  When the U.S. gross domestic product faltered in 2010, the firm had significant gains on their investments in Treasury bonds and other securities, and in November founded the US$10 billion, Pure Alpha Major Markets fund which brought the company's total assets under management to more than US$100 billion.  In 2011 the firm received several honors. It was ranked number one on Institutional Investor's "world's top 100 hedge funds" list. It received the Macro-Focused Hedge Fund Firm of the Year award and the aiCIO Hedge Fund Industry Innovation Award. Absolute Return + Alpha (AR) ranked the company number one in its Hedge Fund Report Card and Billion Dollar Club categories.

At the end of May 2016, Connecticut is expected to approve a plan which will give Bridgewater Associates $22 million in grants and loans in exchange for job training, job creation, and building renovations. The company also must agree to retain 1,402 jobs they already support in Connecticut. The company could also become eligible for as much as $30 million in urban tax credits.

Between 2014 and 2016, the Regents of the University of California withdrew $550 million from Bridgewater Associates also due to concerns about Bridgewater's future leadership. In June 2018, it was announced to clients and employees that Bridgewater would change its corporate structure and become a partnership. By June 2018, the Teacher Retirement System of Texas, the Ontario Municipal Employees Retirement System, the Singapore's sovereign wealth fund and the International Monetary Fund had invested in Bridgewater Associates.

In September 2017, Bridgewater announced plans to launch an investment fund in China with Chinese government's approval.

In 2020, Bridgewater reported hefty losses due to COVID-19 related market volatility, with the flagship pure Alpha II fund losing 18.6% as of August 2020.

Investment philosophy
According to Ray Dalio, Bridgewater Associates is a "global macro firm". It uses "quantitative" investment methods to identify new investments while avoiding unrealistic historical models. Its goal is to structure portfolios with uncorrelated investment returns based on risk allocations rather than asset allocations. Additionally, the company is reported to accept funds from only institutional clients such as pension funds, foundations, endowments, and central banks rather than private investors.

Separation of alpha and beta
The company divides its investments into two basic categories: (1) Beta investments, whose returns are generated through passive management and standard market risk, and (2) Alpha investments, whose goal is to generate higher returns that are uncorrelated to the general market and are actively managed. The principle of separating alpha and beta investments was introduced by Dalio in 1990 and gained the recognition of other equity managers beginning in the year 2000. The firm is reported to be the first hedge fund manager to separate alpha and beta investment strategies and offer dedicated investment funds for each.

Systematic diversification
According to Bloomberg, Bridgewater uses an investing system that combines traditional diversification with "wager[s] on or against markets around the world" and attempts to invest in instruments and markets that do not "move in lock step" with each other. To guide its investment strategies, the company's top executives have compiled hundreds of "decision rules" which are the financial corollary to the firm's employee handbook, Principles, and these investment guidelines have been incorporated into the firm's computers' analysis.

Products
The firm offers three hedge funds to its clients: the Pure Alpha fund, the All Weather fund, and the Pure Alpha Major Markets fund. It also publishes a white paper,  called the Daily Observations, which is read by investors worldwide on a subscription basis.

Pure Alpha
Bridgewater Associates launched its flagship fund, Pure Alpha, in 1989. The fund is described as a "diversified alpha source" that invests across a group of asset classes. It was designed to balance risk amongst a variety of non-correlated assets through active management. It includes 30 or 40 simultaneous trading positions in bonds, currencies, stock indexes and commodities to avoid affecting prices by concentrating funds in a single area. After placing some of the company's excess cash into the Pure Alpha hedge fund to increase its "investing discretion". The fund was closed to new investors in 2006 when it reached its pre-determined, maximum funds level. As of 2019, the fund is reported to have lost money in only three of its 20 years of existence and had an average annualized return of 12 percent. An investment in Pure Alpha has returned 4.5% annualized since 2005 and underperformed major indices.

All Weather
A second fund, called All Weather, was launched in 1996 and highlighted low fees, global inflation-linked bonds and global fixed-income investments. The fund began as the founder's personal trust fund and was subsequently opened to clients. The goal of the fund was to create "high, risk adjusted returns" that exceeded the return of the general market. The All Weather fund contains more than $46 billion and is one of the largest funds in the U.S. as of 2011. In April 2009, after the collapse of Lehman Brothers, the fund moved into "safe portfolio" mode which included nominal and inflation-linked bonds and gold instead of equities, emerging market debt, and commodities.  The fund is reported to contain 40% inflation-linked bonds, 30% Treasury bills, 20% Treasury bonds and 10% gold.

In June 2018, Bridgewater was granted permission to develop and market domestic investment products to qualified investors in mainland China. In October 2018, Bridgewater launched its first Chinese investment product, ‘Bridgewater All Weather China Private Fund Number 1.'

Pure Alpha Major Markets
Under the guidance of then co-CEO Jensen, the firm created the Pure Alpha Major Markets in 2011 with $2.4 billion from existing clients.  In the summer of 2011 the fund was opened to a group of outside investors who had made a total advance commitment of $7.5 billion.  At that time, it was reported to be the largest hedge fund launch. The fund was established to provide an investment vehicle similar to the company's Pure Alpha fund  but with enhanced liquidity by focusing on the major markets such as European bonds. The launch of this fund in 2011 brought the company’s total assets under management to more than $100 billion.

Daily Observations
The company's "Daily Observations" is a private communication and is the flagship product and service offered by the company. The daily notes synthesize Bridgewater's decades of following the markets and offer an alternative perspective on trends that are top of mind for all investors around the world.  It has been characterized as comprehensive, with some editions being up to 43 pages in length. It is reportedly read, on a subscription basis, by  clients, leaders of central banks and managers of pension funds around the world and said to be "one of the most widely forwarded pieces of market analysis" in the industry. It is the centerpiece of the company's outreach program and as of 2009 it was read by members of the U.S. Treasury, and the Executive Office of the Obama Administration.

Corporate affairs

Headquarters
In 1981, the company moved its headquarters 50 miles north of New York City to Wilton, Connecticut, and in the late 1990s it moved to a larger office space on a corporate campus in Westport, Connecticut. As the company continued to expand, it became the sole tenant at the 22-acre campus. The firm's headquarters is described as retreat-like and is surrounded by the trees of a former nature reserve. The campus contains three buildings made of "midcentury modern fieldstone and glass". Since 2000 its staff has grown from 100 to 1500 employees, and the firm has taken office space in three additional buildings in the area. In an effort to consolidate its offices, the company made plans to build a 750,000- square-foot headquarters in Stamford, CT, about 15 miles from its present location in Westport, but cancelled the project in 2014.

Employees
Bridgewater Associates grew from 100 employees in 2003 to 1,500 employees in 2017. The company is reported to be one of the few hedge fund managers that hire its analysts and employees right out of college and from the annual pool of graduates from elite universities. Employees are transported daily in a "fancy" bus that ferries them from Manhattan to the company's Westport offices. According to an article in Bloomberg, "about a quarter of all new hires" leave within the first two years. Those that remain are reported to receive "generous" compensation and form bonds with fellow employees that are "like family" and the company's founder helps to pay for any employees that wish to learn the Transcendental Meditation technique.

Dalio, the founder, relinquished his chief executive officer (CEO) title in July 2011 to take on the role of "mentor." The company's administration consists of three co-CEOs; Greg Jensen, Eileen Murray, former Controller at Morgan Stanley, and David McCormick; the former undersecretary of the Treasury Department. The company also has three co-CIOs (chief investment officers); Dalio, Bob Prince and Greg Jensen (who is also co-CEO). Greg Jensen, the 45-year-old co-CEO, oversees the research programs at the firm and came to the company as a Dartmouth College intern about 15 years earlier.  Britt Harris, formerly of Verizon Investment Management, joined Bridgewater as co-CEO in November 2004 but left six months later. According to Dalio, the cultural fit was a problem, but Harris "is a superstar, with an absolutely fabulous character". From 2010 until early 2013, Bridgewater's general counsel was James Comey, former United States Deputy Attorney General and Director of the Federal Bureau of Investigation from 2013 to 2017. In 2016, Bridgewater had removed Greg Jensen as co-CEO and hired Jon Rubinstein instead. Rubinstein, a former Apple executive, left Bridgewater after 10 months in early 2017. Within a few years, Rubinstein was the third top-level executive to leave Bridgewater Associates after spending less than 12 months on the job. In December 2019, Bridgewater Associates announced that Eileen Murray plans to step down as co-chief executive in March 2020, making David McCormick the sole CEO.

Corporate culture
In 2005, Dalio created a handbook called Principles in response to the fast growth of the company. In 2017 Dalio published a new version of the handbook, Principles: Life & Work, which became a New York Times best seller. The publication is said to be part self-help book, part management manual, and part treatise on the mechanics of natural selection as they function in a business setting. According to one trade journal, six years after the publication of "Principles", the firm's rapid expansion led to the institution of a "bizarre culture of criticism." The company acknowledges that employees "often encounter culture shock" when they begin working there, and Dalio admits: "it's not for everyone". According to the company's web site, employees are encouraged to be assertive, and discussions about disagreements and mistakes are considered an intentional part of the company's culture because they are felt to stimulate both learning and progress. In addition to Principles, Bridgewater employees use the "dot collector," a tool that enables employees to give real-time assessments of each other's views, contributing to the open environment.

A 2011 article in New York Magazine described the company as the "largest and indisputably weirdest hedge fund" because of its unwavering commitment to "total honesty and accountability" and minute detail in its corporate culture. For example, Dalio encourages employees to do "whatever it takes to make the company great" and emphasizes transparency and openness in its decision making processes. All meetings are recorded and can be viewed by any employee as long as the meeting topic is not proprietary. In addition, Dalio says that he fosters "an extreme meritocracy of ideas" and asserts that decisions are made about investments without considerations of hierarchy. He says that any employee can respectfully say anything to anyone in the firm, but they must be prepared to be challenged in return. The company's flat corporate structure aims to remove the barriers associated with traditional asset management firms, and qualities like stodginess and risk-aversion are discouraged. In April 2017, Dalio presented a TED talk highlighting the culture and attributing a majority of Bridgewater's success to identifying the best ideas.

The company has been likened to a cult, but Dalio denies that and insists that the firm is a dedicated "community". An article in the New Yorker by John Cassidy says that "the word cult clearly has connotations that don't apply to an enterprise staffed by highly paid employees who can quit at any moment." Cassidy says the company is located away from other financial institutions and headed by a "strong-willed leader" and that employees use a "unique vocabulary". One client, Bob Jacksha, chief executive officer of the New Mexico Educational Retirement Board, said of the firm: "Every investment manager has its own culture [and] some are more unique than others." While Bridgewater's practice of radical transparency has at times been criticized, executives at the company maintain that open communication helps the firm better evaluate risk and is the key to the firm's success.

In 2016, an employee filed a complaint with the Connecticut Commission on Human Rights and Opportunities, saying that the hedge fund was like a “cauldron of fear and intimidation.”. The New York Times reported that "several former employees recalled one video that Bridgewater showed to new employees that was of a confrontation several years ago between top executives including Mr. Dalio and a woman who was a manager at the time, who breaks down crying".

In 2018, Wharton Professor Adam Grant published a podcast featuring a manager at Bridgewater who was ranked last in terms of performance following a meeting to illustrate how radical transparency works at the firm.

The organization's culture was explored in Robert Kegan's book An Everyone Culture: Becoming a Deliberately Developmental Organization.

Trades 
During COVID-19 pandemic Bridgewater Associates bet against European companies.

References

External links 
 

Hedge fund firms in Connecticut
Investment management companies of the United States
Companies based in Westport, Connecticut
Financial services companies established in 1975
Privately held companies of the United States
Hedge funds
1975 establishments in New York City